The MassKara Festival (Hiligaynon: Pista sang MassKara, Filipino: Pista ng MassKara) is an annual festival with highlights held every 4th Sunday of October in Bacolod, Philippines. The most recent festival was held last October 30, 2021 (with only virtual audience, due to the ongoing COVID-19 pandemic). The festival sites include the Bacolod Public Plaza, the Lacson Tourism Strip and the Bacolod City Government Center.

Etymology
The word "Masskara" is a portmanteau, coined by the late artist Ely Santiago from mass (a multitude of people), and the Spanish word cara (face), thus forming MassKara (a multitude of faces). The word is also a pun on maskara, Filipino for "mask" (itself from Spanish máscara), since it is a prominent feature of the festival and are always adorned with smiling faces, giving rise to Bacolod being  called the "City of Smiles".

History
The Festival first began in 1980. The province relied on sugar cane as its primary agricultural crop and the price of sugar was at an all-time low due to the introduction of sugar substitutes like high fructose corn syrup in the United States. This was the first MassKara Festival and a time of tragedy; on April 22 of that year, the inter-island vessel MV Don Juan carrying many Negrenses, including those belonging to prominent families in Bacolod City, collided with the tanker Tacloban City and sank in Tablas Strait off Mindoro while en route from Manila to Bacolod, which resulted in 18 lives lost, and 115 missing.

In the midst of these events, the local government then headed by the late Mayor Jose "Digoy" Montalvo appropriated a seed fund and enjoined the city's artistic community, civic and business groups to hold a "festival of smiles", to live up to the City's moniker as the "City of Smiles". They reasoned that a festival was also a good opportunity to pull the residents out of the pervasive gloomy atmosphere brought by the Don Juan Tragedy. The initial festival was held during the City's Charter Day celebration on October 19, 1980 and was steered by an organizing committee created by City Hall which was headed by the late councilor Romeo Geocadin and then city tourism officer Evelio Leonardia. It was a declaration by the people of the city that no matter how tough and bad the times were, Bacolod City was going to pull through, survive, and in the end, triumph.

The festival has evolved into one of the major annual tourism attractions of the Philippines over the next four decades.  Held in typical Oktoberfest and Mardi Gras fashion, the MassKara Festival served as a catalyst for far-reaching growth and development of the city's tourism, hospitality, culinary, crafts and souvenirs and services sectors. In later years, the Electric Masskara was added as another attraction of the Festival. For several nights leading to the highlight weekend, tribes of  MassKara dancers garbed in colorful neon and LED lights on illuminated floats make their way up and down the Lacson Strip, a one kilometer stretch of merrymaking dotted with band stages, souvenir stands, exotic car displays and roadside bars and food set-ups put out by restaurant and hotels along the strip.  It is said that beer consumption during the festival is so high that at one time during the first few stagings of the festival, it bled dry the Mandaue brewery of San Miguel Corporation on nearby Cebu island. The company eventually built its Bacolod brewery to serve the city and Negros Island.

The 2019 marks the 40th celebration of the festival, aptly called Ruby Masskara.

Masks
The mask motif of the festival has changed from masks influenced by native Filipinos to those influenced by the Carnival of Venice and the Rio Carnival. Earlier masks were hand-painted and adorned with feathers, flowers and native beads, while contemporary masks feature plastic beads and sequins.

Events

The festival features a street dance competition where people from all walks of life troop to the streets to see masked dancers gyrating to the rhythm of Latin musical beats in a display of mastery, gaiety, coordination and stamina. Major activities include the MassKara Queen beauty pageant, carnivals, drum, bugle corps competitions, food festivals, sports events, musical concerts, agriculture-trade fairs, garden shows, and other special events organized every year.

Electric MassKara
Electric MassKara is a parade with music, lights and floats.

Street dancing
The street dance competition is divided into two categories; the school division, and the barangay division, the latter is considered as the highlight of the street dancing competition.

Grand champions
List of Barangay Category grand champions:

See also
Bacolod
Negros Occidental
List of Philippine-related topics
MassKara Festival Queen
Panaad sa Negros Festival
Mardi Gras

References

Festivals in the Philippines
Tourist attractions in Bacolod
Culture of Negros Occidental